Octomeria decumbens is a species of orchid endemic to southern and southeastern Brazil.

References

External links 

decumbens
Endemic orchids of Brazil
Taxa named by Alfred Cogniaux